Paweł Waloszek (28 April 1938 – 7 September 2018) was a Polish international motorcycle speedway rider who was second in 1970 Individual Speedway World Championship.

Career details

World Championships
 Individual World Championship
 1958 - lost in Continental Semi-Final
 1960 - 12th place in Continental Final
 1961 - 10th place in Continental Final
 1962 -  London - 14th place (2 points)
 1963 - 11th in Continental Final
 1965 - 16th place in European Final
 1966 - injury before European Final
 1967 - 11th in Continental Final
 1968 -  Göteborg - 5th place (10 points)
 1969 - 13th in Continental Final
 1970 -  Wrocław - Silver medal (14 points)
 1971 - 9th in Continental Final
 1972 -  London - 8th place (6 points)
 1973 -  Chorzów - 7th place (8 points)
 1974 - 12th in Continental Semi-Final
 1975 - 15th in Continental Final
 Team World Championship
 1962 -  Slaný - Bronze medal

World Final Appearances

Individual World Championship
 1962 -  London, Wembley Stadium - 14th - 2pts
 1968 -  Göteborg, Ullevi - 5th - 10pts
 1970 -  Wrocław, Olympic Stadium - 2nd - 14pts
 1972 -  London, Wembley Stadium - 8th - 6pts
 1973 -  Chorzów, Silesian Stadium - 7th - 8pts

World Team Cup
 1962 -  Slaný (with Marian Kaiser / Florian Kapała / Joachim Maj / Mieczysław Połukard) - 3rd - 20pts (2)
 1968 -  London, Wembley Stadium (with Edmund Migoś / Andrzej Wyglenda / Edward Jancarz / Henryk Glücklich) - 3rd - 19pts (1)
 1970 -  London, Wembley Stadium (with Antoni Woryna / Jan Mucha / Edmund Migoś / Henryk Glücklich) - 3rd - 20pts (2)
 1971 -  Wroclaw, Olympic Stadium (with Henryk Glücklich / Antoni Woryna / Edward Jancarz / Andrzej Wyglenda) - 3rd - 19pts (5)
 1972 -  Olching, Olching Speedwaybahn (with Zenon Plech / Henryk Glücklich / Marek Cieślak / Zdzisław Dobrucki) - 3rd - 21pts (5)
 1973 -  London, Wembley Stadium (with Edward Jancarz / Zenon Plech / Jerzy Szczakiel) - 4th - 8pts (1)

Polish competitions

 Individual Polish Championship
 1969 - Rybnik - Runner-up
 1972 - Bydgoszcz - Runner-up
 1975 - Częstochowa - Bronze medal
 Team Polish Championship
 1959 - Bronze medal
 1960 - Runner-up
 1969 - Runner-up
 1970 - Runner-up
 1972 - Bronze medal
 1973 - Runner-up
 Golden Helmet
 1962 - 4th place (66 pts)
 1963 - 4th place (55 pts)
 1964 - 5th place (48 pts)
 1965 - 4th place (66 pts)
 1966 - Runner-up
 1967 - 5th place (58 pts)
 1968 - Winner (74 pts)
 1969 - 5th place (59 pts)
 1970 - Runner-up (71 pts)
 1971 - Runner-up (60 pts)
 1972 - 5th place (63 pts)
 1973 - 5th place (59 pts)
 1974 - 9th place (33 pts)
 1975 - 6th place (51 pts)
 1976 - 15th place (11 pts)

See also
 Speedway in Poland
 Poland national speedway team

References

1938 births
2018 deaths
Polish speedway riders
People from Świętochłowice
Leicester Hunters riders
Sportspeople from Silesian Voivodeship